is a Quasi-National Park in Niigata Prefecture, Japan. Designated on 27 July 1950, it has an area of 29,364 ha. It is rated a protected landscape (category V) according to the IUCN.

Like all Quasi-National Parks in Japan, the park is managed by the local prefectural governments.

See also

 List of national parks of Japan

References
Southerland, Mary and Britton, Dorothy. The National Parks of Japan. Kodansha International (1995).

Notes

Parks and gardens in Niigata Prefecture
National parks of Japan
Protected areas established in 1950
1950 establishments in Japan